Azkuna Zentroa  (Basque for Azkuna Centre), previously known as Alhóndiga Bilbao, is a multi-purpose venue located in the city of Bilbao, Spain. It was designed by French designer Philippe Starck in collaboration with Thibaut Mathieu and was opened to the public in stages between 18 May and 24 October 2010. The venue, labeled as a "Culture and Leisure Centre", consist of a cinema multiplex, a fitness centre, a library, showrooms, an auditorium, shops, and a restaurant. In March 2015 its name was officially changed to Azkuna Zentroa in tribute to the late mayor of Bilbao Iñaki Azkuna.

Originally a corn exchange (alhóndiga in Spanish), it was designed by Basque architect Ricardo Bastida and inaugurated in 1909. However, in the 1970s, a new warehouse was planned and the Alhóndiga was abandoned. Several projects were suggested, ranging from public housing, a museum of modern art, or even demolishing the entire building, but all were scrapped. Finally, in 1994 it was decided to renovate it and build a sports and culture centre. The Basque Government decided to declare the building "Public Property of Cultural Interest" in 1999.

References

External links 

  
 Official YouTube channel 
 elcorreo.com special about the Alhóndiga  
 elcorreo.com special about the project 

Buildings and structures in Bilbao
Cinemas in Spain
Sport in Bilbao
Sports venues in the Basque Country (autonomous community)
Tourist attractions in Bilbao
Alhóndigas